Ferret is an interactive computer visualization and analysis environment designed to meet the needs of oceanographers and meteorologists analyzing large and complex gridded data sets. Ferret offers a Mathematica-like approach to analysis; new variables may be defined interactively as mathematical expressions involving data set variables. Calculations may be applied over arbitrarily shaped regions. Fully documented graphics are produced with a single command. It runs on most Unix and Linux systems using X Window for display, and on Windows XP/NT/9x.

External links
Ferret official site

Meteorological data and networks
Earth sciences graphics software
Graphic software in meteorology